Delta bicinctum is a species of potter wasp from Australia.

References

External links
 
 

Potter wasps
Insects described in 1852